Club de Fútbol La Piedad is a Mexican football team which will be a part of the inaugural year of the Liga de Ascenso.  The team resides in Tonala, Jalisco. The club currently places in the Segunda División de México and would not be eligible for promotion, since the club does not count with a stadium with a capacity of 15,000.

Current roster
 Updated on August 29, 2011.

Footnotes

External links
Tercera divicion

Defunct football clubs in Jalisco
Defunct football clubs in Mexico